Bracknell is a constituency in Berkshire represented in the House of Commons of the UK Parliament since 2019 by James Sunderland, a Conservative. It was created for the 1997 general election, replacing the abolished county constituency of East Berkshire.

Constituency profile
The seat covers most of the town of Bracknell, although the northern parts are in the neighbouring Windsor seat. Crowthorne and Sandhurst are also in the seat, interspersed by large areas of forest.  Residents are slightly wealthier than the UK average.

History
From creation in 1997 until 2010, Bracknell's MP was Andrew MacKay of the Conservative Party, who represented the old seat of East Berkshire from 1983. On 14 May 2009, he resigned from his position as parliamentary aide to David Cameron in the wake of a major scandal over his Parliamentary expenses. MacKay and his wife, fellow Tory MP Julie Kirkbride, had wrongfully claimed over £250,000 from the taxpayer for mortgage payments for second homes, in a case of so-called 'double-dipping'. They also wrongfully claimed for each other's travel costs. At a hastily called meeting with his constituents in Bracknell to explain the "unacceptable" expenses claims, Mr MacKay was jeered and called a "thieving toad". A video of the angry meeting was leaked to the press and, after an urgent phone call from David Cameron the next day, MacKay agreed to stand down at the 2010 general election. The Conservative Party chose Phillip Lee, a general practitioner, as its new candidate in an American-style open primary, involving seven candidates including Rory Stewart and Iain Dale in a contest open to all registered Bracknell voters.
2010 election
Lee went on to become the next MP in an election which saw the share of the vote for the Labour Party fall by 11.1%. The Liberal Democrats saw the biggest rise in support of all the parties (+4.5%), overtaking Labour to gain second place behind the Conservative Party. UKIP saw a slight rise in support to 4.4% of the vote. The 2010 election also saw for the first time the Green Party and British National Party vying for the seat.

2017 election
Lee held his seat at the 2017 general election. He gained 3.1% of votes, but Labour increased its share by 13.3%. Lee received 32,882 votes, Paul Bidwell (Labour) in second place had 16,866 votes. On 3 September 2019, Lee resigned from the Conservative party to join the Liberal Democrats due to the Conservative party's support for Brexit. At the 2019 General Election he unsuccessfully contested the adjacent Wokingham seat for that party.

2019 election

James Sunderland was elected for the Conservative party with 58.7% of the vote.

Boundaries and boundary changes 

1997–2010: The Borough of Bracknell Forest wards of Binfield, Bullbrook, Central Sandhurst, College Town, Crowthorne, Garth, Great Hollands North, Great Hollands South, Hanworth, Harmanswater, Little Sandhurst, Old Bracknell, Owlsmoor, Priestwood, Warfield, and Wildridings, and the District of Wokingham wards of Finchampstead North, Finchampstead South, and Wokingham Without.

The Borough of Bracknell wards had formed the majority of the abolished County Constituency of East Berkshire.  The two Finchampstead wards were transferred from Reading East, and the ward of Wokingham Without was transferred from Wokingham.

2010–present: The Borough of Bracknell Forest wards of Bullbrook, Central Sandhurst, College Town, Crown Wood, Crowthorne, Great Hollands North, Great Hollands South, Hanworth, Harmanswater, Little Sandhurst and Wellington, Old Bracknell, Owlsmoor, Priestwood and Garth, and Wildridings and Central, and the District of Wokingham wards of Finchampstead North, Finchampstead South, and Wokingham Without.

Northern parts, including Binfield, were transferred to Windsor.

Bracknell is based around the town of Bracknell and the Bracknell Forest authority. It is bordered by the constituencies of Wokingham, Maidenhead, Windsor, Surrey Heath, Aldershot, and North East Hampshire.

Members of Parliament

Elections

Elections in the 2010s

Elections in the 2000s

Elections in the 1990s

See also 
 List of parliamentary constituencies in Berkshire

Notes

References

External links 
nomis Constituency Profile for Bracknell — presenting data from the ONS annual population survey and other official statistics.

Parliamentary constituencies in Berkshire
Constituencies of the Parliament of the United Kingdom established in 1997
Bracknell